Dekon is a village in Sulaymaniyah Governorate, Iraq. The village's population consists of more than 100 families.

It has a primary and secondary school, health clinic, water project, asphalt road, and a phone line that connects it to the town of Khormal and to all of Kurdistan and Iraq.

It is 3 km away from the town of Khormal and 10 km from the city of Halabja.

It was destroyed two times by the Iraqi regime, the first time in 1913 and the second time in 1987. It was rebuilt after the Kurdish revolution of 1991.

References

Populated places in Sulaymaniyah Province
Kurdish settlements in Iraq